Ronald "Tiny Ron" Taylor (November 21, 1947 – November 28, 2019) was an American film actor and former basketball player, known for his work in feature films such as The Rocketeer (1991) and Ace Ventura: Pet Detective (1994), and in television series such as Star Trek: Deep Space Nine, Star Trek: Voyager, and as Al, the very tall police detective whose face is always out of frame in the Police Squad! and The Naked Gun franchise. His roles tended to exploit  his 7 ft (2.13 m) frame.

Early life
Taylor was born in Torrance, California. He attended North Torrance High School and graduated from the University of Southern California.

Sports career

Taylor was drafted by the Seattle SuperSonics in the second round of the 1969 NBA draft, but never played in the NBA, instead he started playing in the American Basketball Association. He played for four teams from 1969 to 1972: the New York Nets and Washington Caps (1969–70); the Virginia Squires (1970–71); and the Pittsburgh Condors (1971–72). He played 75 of his 77 career games in his first season, 72 of them for the Nets. He scored 371 total points (4.8 ppg), 294 total rebounds (3.7 rpg), and 68 assists (0.9 apg). He also played some basketball in Austria before deciding to be an actor.

Acting career
When Taylor applied to the Screen Actors Guild, he learned that the name "Ron Taylor" was already in use by another actor. His acting teacher suggested he use "Tiny Ron", figuring that in a niche category populated by actors with such screen names as "André the Giant," the name "Tiny Ron" would stand out.

Filmography
Police Squad! (1982, TV Series) – Al (uncredited)
Seven Hours to Judgment (1988) – Ira Martin
The Naked Gun: From the Files of Police Squad! (1988) – Al
Road House (1989) – Mountain
The Rocketeer (1991) – Lothar(a.k.a. Frankenstien) / Good Old Boy / Voice of Jerry Butkis
Ace Ventura: Pet Detective (1994) – Roc
Last Man Standing (1996) – Jacko the Giant
Star Trek: Voyager (1998 - 1 episode)
Star Trek: Deep Space Nine (1993–1999 – 7 episodes) – Maihar'du
Zigs (2001) – Terry
Six: The Mark Unleashed (2004) – Eddie
Sasquatch Mountain (2006) – Sasquatch
Holyman Undercover (2010) – Himself
Brother White (2012) – Himself
The Book of Esther (2013) – Nasir
Dancer and the Dame (2015) – Martin

References

volt. 

1947 births
2019 deaths
American expatriate basketball people in Austria
American male film actors
American male television actors
American men's basketball players
Basketball players from California
Centers (basketball)
New York Nets players
People from Torrance, California
Pittsburgh Condors players
Seattle SuperSonics draft picks
USC Trojans men's basketball players
Virginia Squires players
Washington Caps players